Basil LeFlore (c.1811 - 15 October 1886) was the last elected governor of the Choctaw Nation before the Civil War. He was the brother of a former chief Greenwood LeFlore. He was one of three Choctaw chiefs who used the title governor following the tribe's relocation to Indian Territory, and served from 1859 to 1860. Following his departure from office, the tribe began designating its elected executive as chief instead of governor. He later served as the nation's auditor until his death.

Biography
LeFlore was of mixed Choctaw and French ancestry, but he was brought up among his mother's people as a Choctaw. In their matrilineal kinship system, children were considered born to the mother's people and took their social status from her family. LeFlore attended the mission school at Brainard, Mississippi. For several years he attended the Johnson Indian School in Kentucky.

After the Choctaw were forced out of Mississippi by the United States under the Indian Removal Act, LeFlore moved with his people to Indian Territory in 1831. He soon held a high place in the councils of his people. He was chosen as governor of his people, a hereditary position, in 1860, serving until 1875.

LeFlore was a member of the Methodist Church and was well educated. He was said to adopt the European-American life. The Choctaw are one of the Five Civilized Tribes of the American Southeast, and had adopted certain United States customs that they thought were useful.

References

1811 births
1886 deaths
Methodists from Oklahoma
Native American Christians
Native American leaders
Choctaw Nation of Oklahoma people
American people of French descent
People from Carrollton, Alabama
19th-century Native Americans